Doğan Abukay  is a Turkish experimental physicist and retired professor of Physics at the Izmir Institute of Technology His research areas include Applied Physics, Superconductivity, High Temperature Superconductors, Thin Film Growth, Josephson Junctions, SQUIDs and applications.

Publications
 Complete list at Google Scholar
  Click for the complete list of publications

References

 Publications Scholar
 Publications IZTECH

Turkish non-fiction writers
Turkish physicists
Middle East Technical University alumni
Experimental physicists
Living people
Year of birth missing (living people)